Orléans – Bricy Air Base  is a French Air and Space Force (Armée de l'air et de l'espace) (ALAE) base.

The mission of the base is primarily tactical airlift.

Units
 Escadron de Transport 1/61 Touraine with the Airbus A400M Atlas
 Escadron de Transport 2/61 Franche-Comté with the Lockheed C-130H Hercules, Lockheed Martin C-130J Super Hercules and the Lockheed Martin KC-130J
 Escadron de Transport 3/61 Poitou with the Lockheed C-130H Hercules, Transall C-160 and the de Havilland Canada DHC-6 Twin Otter
 Centre d'Instruction des Equipages de Transport 340 Général Lionel de Marmier

Aircraft
 27 Transall C-160F
 5 Lockheed C-130H Hercules
 8 Lockheed C-130H-30
 c11 Airbus A400M

History
Orléans-Bricy Air Base was built prior to World War II as a French Air Force facility. It was seized by the Germans in June 1940 during the Battle of France, and was used as a major Luftwaffe military airfield during the occupation. LG 1 (Luftflotte (Air Fleet) 3/Fliegerkorps (Division) V/1st Heavy Fighter Wing) stationed Junkers Ju 88A-5 (Fuselage Code L1+) day/night interceptors at the base.

It was liberated by Allied ground forces about 22 August 1944 during the Northern France Campaign. Almost immediately, the USAAF IX Engineering Command 832d, 833dd and 877th Engineer Aviation Battalions began clearing the base of mines and destroyed Luftwaffe aircraft and repairing operational facilities for use by American aircraft. Subsequently, Bricy became a USAAF Ninth Air Force combat airfield, designated as "A-50" about 24 August, only a few days after its capture from German forces.

Almost immediately, the repaired base became home to numerous combat units.
 394th Bombardment Group, flew Martin B-26 Marauders from 18 September through 8 October 1944
 440th Troop Carrier Group, flew Douglas C-47 Skytrains from 2 November 1944 through 18 October 1945. The C-47s pulled gliders in the airborne assault across the Rhine (Operation Varsity).

The Americans returned control of the base to the French Air Force at the end of October 1945 and it returned to being a French military airfield.

After the war, the base was completely rebuilt. An 8000' new jet runway was laid down along with two circular marguerite systems of hardstands that could be revetted later with earth for added protection. The Marguerite consist of fifteen to eighteen hardstands around a semicircular taxiway. Each hardstand can hold one or two aircraft, and allows the planes to be spaced approximately 150 feet (46 m) apart. Each marguerite is dispersed at each end of the runway, allowing the aircraft to be launched quickly. Each squadron is assigned to a separate hangar/hardstand complex. The wartime main runway was extended to become the taxiway for the new jet runway. Additional dispersed aircraft parking, ramp space and hangars were also constructed, along with a completely new administrative and personnel area. A 4000' grass runway was also constructed for glider and small aircraft landings.

Bricy is the home of the Airbus A400M Atlas new European tactical cargo aircraft for the French Air and Space Force.

See also

 Advanced Landing Ground

References

 French Senate Document, LIST AIR BASES, AND THEIR MAIN ACTIVITIES

External links

Orleans-Bricy
World War II airfields in France
Airfields of the United States Army Air Forces in France
Airports established in 1933
Buildings and structures in Loiret